Reform and the Reformers is an essay written by Henry David Thoreau.  The essay was never published in his lifetime, and has been cobbled together from existing lecture notes that Thoreau himself picked over for his other writings, such as Walden and A Week on the Concord and Merrimack Rivers.

The essay reflects Thoreau's frustration with the multitude of reformersprohibitionists, utopian communists, free love advocates, religious revivalists, and the likewho were roaming about New England at the time hawking their prescriptions for a better world.

Thoreau's audience in Boston were of the open-minded liberal varietypeople who were typically the most interested in and the most vulnerable to the charms of these reformersand so Thoreau begins his lecture slyly with a fairly superficial but probably sympathetic attack on the Reformer's great enemy: the Conservative.  Further disarming his audience with a witticism or two, he then turns on them by spending the rest of the lecture attacking the major genre of lecturers that they more typically come to hear: the Reformer.

His major complaint is much the same as the one he expressed when reviewing John Etzler's technological utopianism (see Paradise (to be) Regained)that the utopianists, and Reformers in general, are too concerned with exerting control over and reshaping The World, or Society, or The Government, or The Family, and not concerned enough about better using the control they already exercise over themselves:

He suspects that these Reformers are acting from some subconscious motive  (or, using less psychoanalytic terms: "some obscure, and perhaps unrecognized private grievance") that is overtly philanthropic, but covertly a scheme for avoiding the real necessity for self-reform.

He reminds the Reformers that they speak with their deeds more than with their wordsthat if "the lecturer against the use of money is paid for his lecture, … that is the precept which [men] hear and believe, and they have a great deal of sympathy with him"and noting that it's easy to lecture about "non-resistance" but the proof of the pudding is when "one Mr. Resistance" steps forward to take part in the debate.

He notes:
For the most part by simply agreeing in opinion with the preacher and Reformer I defend myself and get rid of him, for he really asks for no sympathy with deedsand this trick it would be well for the irritable Conservative to know and practice.

So he recommends that Reformers, and those interested in Reform, instead work on themselves.  He anticipates the objection that would invert his argument by saying that he is recommending a narcissistic evasion of responsibility for grappling with social problems.  The problems of the social order, of the political order, of the family, and so on, Thoreau insists, are rooted in individualsthe corrupt institutions are only the symptom:

The disease and disorder in society are wont to be referred to the false relations in which men live one to another, but strictly speaking there can be no such thing as a false relation if the condition of the things related is true. False relations grow out of false conditions.

On-line sources 
 
 Reform and the Reformers at The Picket Line.

Printed sources 
 The Writings of Henry David Thoreau: Reform Papers, Princeton University Press, 1973
 The Higher Law: Thoreau on Civil Disobedience and Reform, Princeton University Press, 2004
 My Thoughts are Murder to the State, CreateSpace Independent Publishing Platform, 2007

Essays by Henry David Thoreau